Hemlock Run is a tributary of West Branch Fishing Creek in Sullivan County, Pennsylvania, in the United States. The stream has three unnamed tributaries. Wisconsinan Till Moraine, Wisconsinan Bouldery Till, Wisconsinan Flow-Till, and Wisconsinan Till all occur near the stream.

Course
Hemlock Run begins on a mountain known as Roundtop in Davidson Township. It flows south-southwest for several tenths of a mile, receiving an unnamed tributary from the right. It then turns southeast for a few tenths of a mile and receives an unnamed tributary from the left before turning south-southwest and then south-southeast. The stream enters a deep valley and receives another unnamed tributary from the right. Over the next several tenths of a mile, it gradually turns south and reaches its confluence with West Branch Fishing Creek.

Tributaries
Hemlock Run has no named tributaries. However, it does have three unnamed tributaries.

Geography and geology

Hemlock Run has a bedrock gorge. Additionally, the stream has waterfalls along its length. There are several distinct arcuate ridges of till in the valley of the stream.

The terminus of the glaciers during the late Wisconsinan period of glaciation was in the vicinity of Hemlock Run. There are two buried valleys near the stream, one on either side of its gorge and waterfall reach. One of the valleys follows Hemlock Run in a northerly direction.

A small portion of the valley of Hemlock Run is on bedrock consisting of sandstone and shale. The Wisconsinan Till Moraine occurs near the stream in its lower reaches, as does the Wisconsinan Bouldery Till. Both of these are glacial or resedimented glacial tills. The latter has boulders consisting of quartz, sandstone, and conglomerate on the surface. A resedimented glacial till known as the Wisconsinan Flow-Till also occurs near the stream in its lower reaches. The Wisconsinan Till occurs in the upper reaches of the watershed.

Watershed
The stream is entirely within the United States Geological Survey quadrangle of Sonestown. It is in the eastern part of that quadrangle. The stream is situated on the northern side of North Mountain.

There are wingwalls made of concrete in the vicinity of Hemlock Run. The Pennsylvania Game Commission has a permit to maintain the riprap and the streambed with the wingwalls.

History
Hemlock Run was entered into the Geographic Names Information System on August 2, 1979. Its identifier in the Geographic Names Information System is 1176814.

See also
Laurel Run (West Branch Fishing Creek), next tributary of West Branch Fishing Creek going downstream
Slip Run (West Branch Fishing Creek), next tributary of West Branch Fishing Creek going upstream
List of tributaries of Fishing Creek (North Branch Susquehanna River)
List of rivers of Pennsylvania

References

Rivers of Sullivan County, Pennsylvania
Tributaries of Fishing Creek (North Branch Susquehanna River)
Rivers of Pennsylvania